This is a list of the National Register of Historic Places listings in Carbon County, Utah.

This is intended to be a complete list of the properties and districts on the National Register of Historic Places in Carbon County, Utah, United States. Latitude and longitude coordinates are provided for many National Register properties and districts; these locations may be seen together in a map.

There are 316 properties and districts listed on the National Register in the county, including 1 National Historic Landmark. Of these, almost 300 are archaeological sites in Nine Mile Canyon, and little is publicly made available about those sites beyond their names, almost all of which are given as Smithsonian trinomial codes. One other property in the county was once listed on the Register, but has since been removed.



Current listings

|}

Former listing

|}

See also
 List of National Historic Landmarks in Utah
 National Register of Historic Places listings in Utah

References

External links

Carbon